Adolfo Miguel Ángel de Uribe Olano (29 September 1882 – after 1907) was a Spanish footballer who played as a forward for Athletic Club. He is best known for scoring Bilbao's only goal in the 1906 Copa del Rey Final.

Playing career

Mittweida
Adolfo Uribe was born in Bilbao on 29 September 1882. Between 1901 and 1905 he studied Electromechanical Engineering at the Mittweida technical school (Saxony, Germany). There he developed an interest in football and began playing with the Mittweidaer Ballspiel-Club, the school's football team, which had been founded in 1896 by students. In his years at Mittweida, he gained popularity as a football and rugby player. When he returned to Bilbao after completing his studies in 1905, he joined Athletic Club, with whom he played between 1905 and 1908.

Bilbao
He made his competitive debut for Athletic on 10 April 1906, in the final of the 1906 Copa del Rey, netting a goal in a 1–4 loss to Madrid FC (now Real Madrid. In 1907, the best players from Athletic and Unión Vizcaino came together to form Bizcaya, which was specially created to take part in the 1907 Copa del Rey, but Uribe was not elected into the final cut, and without him, they again lost the final to Madrid FC. He stayed loyal to the club until 1908.

Honours
Athletic Bilbao
Copa del Rey:
Runner-up: 1906

References

1882 births
Year of death missing
Spanish footballers
Association football forwards
Footballers from Bilbao
Athletic Bilbao footballers